Manqabad also spelled Mankabad (from ) is a town in Upper Egypt, near the city of Asyut. A military station was located in the town which was referred to as "beyond civilization", being the last vestige of the Nile River Valley before the southern desert. In the 1940s, the station had 3000 officers and soldiers, including a number of whom like Gamal Abdel Nasser, Khaled Mohieddin and Anwar Sadat who would become members of the Free Officers Movement. In 1965, an ancient Coptic site was accidentally found at Manqabad and major excavations were undertaken there in 1976, 1984, and 1995. Several churches and chapels dating from the 7th to 8th centuries were excavated.

Surname
Manqabad is also the town of origin of the Manqabadi (sometimes spelled "Mankabady" or "Mankbadi") family, which was formerly one of the oldest Upper Egyptian nobilities.

References

Bibliography

Populated places in Asyut Governorate
Coptic history
Villages in Egypt